Angiolillo is an Italian given name and surname. Notable people with the name include:

Angiolillo Arcuccio (fl. 1440–1492), Italian painter
Dominick Angiolillo, Italian cardiologist
Luciana Angiolillo (born 1925), Italian actress
Michele Angiolillo (1871–1897), Italian anarchist